Tony Rafty  (born Anthony Raftopoulos; 12 October 1915 – 9 October 2015) was a Greek-Australian artist. He specialised in drawing caricatures.

Biography
Rafty was born in Paddington, New South Wales into a family of Greek origin. As a boy he first started drawing caricatures whilst caddying during the Depression.

During World War II, Rafty served as a war artist and journalist for the Australian Army, serving in New Guinea, Borneo and Singapore. He sketched the surrender of the Japanese in Singapore, and covered the release of POWs from prison camps, including Batu Lintang camp in Kuching, Sarawak. He completed many sketches of war action including a memorable one of Lord Louis Mountbatten. A few years later he covered the Indonesian War of Independence, and befriended President Sukarno of Indonesia. His considerable number of works from that era are housed in the National Library and the Australian War Memorial in Canberra, with others held at the Imperial War Museum in London.

Rafty caricatured politicians, sportspeople, and entertainers. He sketched sportsmen and women at every Olympic Games from 1948 (in London) to 1996 (in Atlanta). His work has been exhibited worldwide and over 15,000 of his caricatures have been featured in newspapers and magazines. In 1981 Rafty became the world's first caricaturist to have subjects appear on national stamps, with caricatures of sportsmen Victor Trumper , Walter Lindrum , Sir Norman Brookes  and Darby Munro  appearing on stamps issued by Australia Post. He also provided courtroom sketches for news bulletins on the Seven Network.

Rafty was one of the founding members of the Australian Black and White Artists Club and served as its president; for 23 years he was on the Board of Directors of the Sydney Journalists Club, where he also held the position of President; he also served the Australian War Correspondents’ Association, and for many years, led the Australian War Correspondents Society veterans at the Anzac Day march.

In 1985, Rafty was awarded the Gold Cross of Mount Athos, one of Greece's highest honours, and in 1991 he was awarded the Order of Australia Medal for services to the media. Sir William Dargie, an Australian artist, eight-time winner of the Archibald Prize, and war artist with Rafty in World War II commented: “Tony Rafty is simply splendid. He not only brings an intellectual quality to his work, but he does it so well within a social context that he creates subjects which have a life of their own.”

Personal life
Rafty was married to Shirley Morey for 66 years, the daughter of the New South Wales Labor politician Tom Morey. Shirley died in 2012. They had five children.

On 12 October 2005, Rafty celebrated his 90th birthday. He died on 9 October 2015, in an Eastern Suburbs hospital in Sydney, NSW from complications of pneumonia, three days short of his 100th birthday.

Further reading
"Tony Rafty: Caricaturist and Australian National Treasure" by Greg Tingle
Design and Art Australia Online

References

1915 births
2015 deaths
Artists from Sydney
Australian people of Greek descent
Australian caricaturists
Australian cartoonists
Australian comics artists
Australian war artists
Australian Army officers
Australian Army personnel of World War II
Recipients of the Medal of the Order of Australia
World War II artists